Tioga is an unincorporated community in Walker Township, Hancock County, Illinois, United States.

Geography

References
 

Unincorporated communities in Illinois
Unincorporated communities in Hancock County, Illinois